Ariosto is an Italian origin word. It is used as a surname and a masculine given name. People with the name include:

Surname
Egidio Ariosto (1911–1998), Italian politician
Ludovico Ariosto (1474–1533), Italian poet

Given name
Ariosto Temporin (born 1955), Italian rower
Ariosto A. Wiley (1848–1908), American politician

Italian masculine given names
Surnames of Italian origin